Liam Scott Chipperfield (born 14 February 2004) is a Swiss professional footballer who plays as midfielder for FC Basel in the Swiss Super League and their U-21 team in the Swiss Promotion League (third tier of the Swiss football league system).

Club career
Chipperfield started his youth football with Basel in 2013. He went through all the junior levels before advancing to their U-18 team in July 2019. In the 2020–21 U-18 Elite League Chipperfield played eight games scoring five goals leading the team to the table top. He advanced to their first team during their 2020–21 season under head coach Ciriaco Sforza. Chipperfield made his match debut in the test match against FC Schaffhausen in mid-November 2020. The youngster scored the first goal of the match as they took an early lead in the 4–0 win.

On 4 December 2020, FC Basel announced that Chipperfield had signed his first professional contract with the club. With the professional contract Chipperfield advanced to Basel's U-21 team and in his first five games scored three goals, two of which were in the game against Chiasso on 13 September 2021.

Chipperfield made his first-team debut on 19 September in the second round of the Swiss Cup as Basel won 3–0 in the match against FC Rorschach-Goldach 17. He scored his first goal for the first team on 13 March 2022 in a 2:0 win against Servette FC.

International career
Chipperfield has also played for various U-national teams. He made his debut for the U-15 on 16 April 2019 against Wales U15 and his debut in the Swiss U-16 on 24 September in the match against Italy U-16. He scored a goal in the return match two days later as the Swiss won by three goals to one. On 1 July 2021 he advanced to the Swiss U-18 team, for whom he has played twice to date.

Private life
Liam, who holds both Swiss and Australian nationality, is the son of FCB legend Australian Scott Chipperfield, who has celebrated seven league championship titles with Rotblau between 2001 and 2012 and helped to shape an era.

External links
 Profile on fcb-archiv.ch homepage
 Profile on the ASF/SFV homepage
 Profile on Swiss Football League homepage

References

2004 births
Living people
Footballers from Basel
Swiss people of Australian descent
Swiss men's footballers
Association football midfielders
Switzerland youth international footballers
Swiss Super League players
FC Basel players